The 1947 Pacific Tigers football team was an American football team that represented the College of the Pacific—now known as the University of the Pacific—as a member of the California Collegiate Athletic Association (CCAA) during the 1947 college football season. In their first season under head coach Larry Siemering, the Tigers compiled an overall record of 10–1 with a mark 5–0 in conference play, winning the CCAA title. They outscored all opponents by a combined total of 373 to 111. At the end of the season, the Tigers were invited to two different bowl games. The first was the Grape Bowl in Lodi, California versus Utah State. The second was a New Year's Day (1948) game, the Raisin Bowl in Fresno, California against Wichita. The Tigers were victorious in both of the bowl games.

Schedule

References

Pacific
Pacific Tigers football seasons
California Collegiate Athletic Association football champion seasons
Pacific Tigers football